Janet Boyer Wolfe (June 13, 1933 – July 28, 1951), also known as Jeanette Wolfe, was an American professional wrestler. She was the foster daughter of Billy Wolfe and Mildred Burke. She was trained by her father, who operated a troupe of women wrestlers associated with the NWA.

Death 
On July 27, 1951, Wolfe was body-slammed hard on the mat by Ella Waldek, to whom she lost the match in approximately seven minutes, which might have ruptured a vein in her stomach. Later that same evening, in the final contest of the benefit show at Patterson Field in East Liverpool, Ohio, she was scheduled to be the tag-team partner of Eva Lee, but she was complaining of a major headache minutes prior to this. Nevertheless she wrestled for a few minutes before tagging Lee, who then saw her partner collapse on the ring apron.

The match was stopped as people attended to Wolfe, who never regained consciousness. She was rushed to the hospital, where she died at 4:00 a.m. on July 28. The official cause of death was a brain hemorrhage, and the doctor found that a blood clot had formed possibly six or seven days before, signifying that Waldek was not to blame for her death, even though police questioned all three women involved in the match and ultimately let them go.

In the aftermath, Waldek continued to perform and was labeled as a murderer by the crowd, something which is said to have helped her notoriety. Additionally, Waldek always believed that the huge meal that Wolfe ate between the two matches contributed to her death.

See also
List of premature professional wrestling deaths

References

External links

The Queen of the Ring: Sex, Muscles, Diamonds, and the Making of an American wrestler
 

1933 births
1951 deaths
American female professional wrestlers
Professional wrestlers from Minnesota
Professional wrestling deaths
20th-century American women
20th-century professional wrestlers
Sports deaths in Ohio